David Guttenberg (born May 26, 1951) is an American politician serving as a member of the Fairbanks North Star Borough Assembly. A member of the Democratic Party, he was a member of the Alaska House of Representatives from 2003 to 2019 of which his nephew, Grier Hopkins, succeeded him.

Guttenberg missed much of the legislative session in 2013 due to the illness of his wife Marilyn, who died on October 7 that year.

References

External links

 Alaska State Legislature – Representative David Guttenberg official government website
 Project Vote Smart – Representative David Guttenberg (AK) profile
 Follow the Money – David Guttenberg
 2006 2004 2002 1996 campaign contributions
 Alaska's Democratic Caucus – David Guttenberg profile
 David Guttenberg at 100 Years of Alaska's Legislature

1951 births
21st-century American politicians
American builders
Jewish American state legislators in Alaska
Living people
Democratic Party members of the Alaska House of Representatives
People from Queens, New York
Politicians from Fairbanks, Alaska
21st-century American Jews